The 19th Maine Infantry Regiment was an infantry regiment that served in the Union Army during the American Civil War.

Service
19th Maine was organized at Bath, Maine and mustered into Federal service for a three-year enlistment on August 25, 1862.

The total loss of the 19th Maine in the two days of fighting [at Gettysburg] were 12 officers and 220 men, almost 53% of the 19th. The regiment took into battle on the second day of July 440 officers and men."

The regiment absorbed the 5th Company of Unassigned Maine Infantry in November 1864.

The regiment was discharged from service on May 31, 1865 following the Union victory.

Total strength and casualties
1,441 men served in the 19th Maine Infantry Regiment during its service.  It lost 192 enlisted men killed in action or died of wounds.  501 members of the regiment were wounded in action, 184 died of disease, and 47 died in Confederate prisons for a total of 376 fatalities from all causes.

Commanders
 Colonel Seldon Connor
 Colonel Francis Edward Heath
 Colonel Isaac Warren Starbird

See also

 List of Maine Civil War units
 Maine in the American Civil War

Notes

References
 Hadden, Robert Lee. 1995. "The Granite Glory: the 19th Maine at Gettysburg." Gettysburg: historical articles of lasting interest, July 1, 1995, issue no. 13. Pages 50–63: maps, portraits. 
 Smith, John Day. 1909. The History of the Nineteenth Regiment of Maine Volunteer Infantry, 1862-1865. Minneapolis: Great Western. 1909.
State of Maine Civil War Website Page on the 19th Maine
The Civil War Archive

External link

Units and formations of the Union Army from Maine
Military units and formations established in 1862
Military units and formations disestablished in 1865
1862 establishments in Maine